Jungle Man is a 1941 American film directed by Harry L. Fraser and starring Buster Crabbe in his first of many films for Producers Releasing Corporation. He is reunited with Charles B. Middleton from the Flash Gordon serials. Cinematographer and associate producer Mervyn Freeman (1890–1965) 
was an experienced newsreel cameraman.

Plot summary 
Bruce Kellogg and his friend Alex are off to Africa on an expedition to the "City of the Dead" that is actually footage of Angkor Wat.  Bruce's fiancée Betty and her father decide to go along to visit her father's brother James who is a missionary in the same part of Africa.  Arriving at the Rev Graham's home they meet Dr Hammond who has spent five years developing a serum to a deadly fever that rages in the area.  The results of his work are placed on a freighter to America that has been sunk by a submarine.

As Alex and Bruce venture to the lost city, an epidemic of the fever rages in the territory.

Cast 
Buster Crabbe as Dr. Robert Hammond, aka Junga
Charles B. Middleton as Rev. James Graham
Sheila Darcy as Betty Graham
Vince Barnett as Buckthorn the Guide
Weldon Heyburn as Bruce Kellogg
Robert Carson as Andy
Paul Scott as William Graham
Hal Price as Capt. Aleck
Floyd Shackelford as Friday

Production 
The film had the working title of King of the Tropics. In 1951 it was retitled Drums of Africa as part of a package of PRC films now titled "Pictorial Films" that were sold to television.

Notes

External links 

1941 films
1940s English-language films
American black-and-white films
1940s romance films
1941 adventure films
Producers Releasing Corporation films
Films directed by Harry L. Fraser
American adventure films
American romance films
1940s American films